The Catholic Diocese of Lindisfarne is a titular see of the Catholic Church. The diocese existed from the seventh century until Bishop Aldhun moved it to Durham in 995.

In 1970, the Pope Paul VI revived the see of Lindisfarne as the name of a titular see. The first three bishops to hold the title served as auxiliary bishops in the Archdiocese of Westminster. The fourth is an apostolic nuncio and holds the title with the personal title of archbishop.

Holders of the title
Victor Guazzelli (1970–2004)
John Arnold (2005–2014)
John Wilson (2016–2019)
Michael Francis Crotty, with the dignity of archbishop (2020–present)

References

Lindisfarne
Lindisfarne